The 1978 Mississippi State Bulldogs football team represented Mississippi State University during the 1978 NCAA Division I-A football season. The Bulldogs were not invited to a bowl game despite being eligible. After the season, head coach Bob Tyler resigned.

Schedule

References

Mississippi State
Mississippi State Bulldogs football seasons
Mississippi State Bulldogs football